William Faulkner was an American novelist.

William Faulkner may also refer to: 

 William M. Faulkner, United States Marine Corps lieutenant general
 William Faulkner (cricketer) (born 1923), English first-class cricketer
 William Faulkner (soccer), Australian international soccer player

See also 
 William Falconer (disambiguation)
 Faulkner (surname)
 William Faulkner Foundation
 William Faulkner House, Oxford, Lafayette County, Mississippi
 William Faulkner – William Wisdom Creative Writing Competition